Bathia is a town and commune in Northern Algeria.

Plot
World Off Bathia

Communes of Aïn Defla Province